Ceroplesis calabarica is a species of beetle in the family Cerambycidae. It was described by Chevrolat in 1858. It is known from Angola, Benin,  the Democratic Republic of the Congo, Cameroon, Gabon, Equatorial Guinea, Ghana, Mozambique, Nigeria, Kenya, the Republic of the Congo, Uganda, Togo, and Zambia. Its diet includes Coffea arabica and Coffea canephora.

Varietas
 Ceroplesis calabarica var. congolensis Hintz, 1920
 Ceroplesis calabarica var. immaculata Hintz, 1920
 Ceroplesis calabarica var. mozambica Hintz, 1920
 Ceroplesis calabarica var. transitiva Breuning, 1937

References

calabarica
Beetles described in 1858